A power struggle is a contest among people seeking to fill a power vacuum. The term may also refer to:

 Power Struggle, a song by the British industrial music/hard rock band Sunna
 NJPW Power Struggle, an annual professional wrestling event promoted by New Japan Pro Wrestling (NJPW)